Bittermann is a surname. Notable people with the surname include:

Jim Bittermann, Senior European correspondent for CNN since 1996
Klaus Bittermann, (born 1952), German author and publisher
Torsten Bittermann, (born 1968), German football manager and football player

See also
Bitterman

German-language surnames
Jewish surnames

de:Bittermann